Oedematopiella is a genus of flies belonging to the family Dolichopodidae. It was established in 2011 for two species from Costa Rica, Oedematopiella sarae and Oedematopiella nathaliae. It is related to the genus Oedematopus.

References

Hydrophorinae
Dolichopodidae genera
Diptera of North America